Atlantic Entertainment Group, also known as Atlantic Releasing Corporation, was an independent film production and distribution company founded by Tom Coleman and Michael Rosenblatt in 1974.

History 
Their initial releases were mostly geared to arthouse audiences, with an especially large number of Australian productions, as well as two Brazilian productions, Eu Te Amo (1981) and Lady on the Bus (1978), that introduced American audiences to actress Sonia Braga. They shifted their focus to small-budgeted independent films in the early 1980s, beginning with the surprise success of Valley Girl (1983), directed by Martha Coolidge. Night of the Comet, released in 1984, would be their first film to open on over 1000 screens.

By 1984, the company had signed an agreement with CBS/Fox Video, whereas a "conceptual partnership" that launched the Atlantic Video label, and among of the launch titles set up by Atlantic Video were Alphabet City, Roadhouse 66, Night of the Comet and Vamping. Atlantic International was also launched and license overseas rights to various films territory by territory.

In 1985, they began a relationship with Paramount Pictures whereby the studio provided them money for larger-scale theatrical releases in exchange for home video and television rights to their films. The company made its big break with the success of Teen Wolf, which then spawned a franchise that year. In 1985, Atlantic Releasing Corporation started the Clubhouse Pictures label, which was designed to release films for a family audience, which set up the Clubhouse Pictures Family Network of theaters.

On July 30, 1986, Jonathan Dana was hired by Atlantic Entertainment Group to supervise all Atlantic activities, via divisions Atlantic Releasing Corporation, Atlantic Television, Clubhouse Pictures and Atlantic International, and decided to "systemize" the top management to accommodate its growth to be a mini-major film studio.

In November 1987, Atlantic Entertainment teamed up with Zenith Productions for a $20 million, three-picture agreement, following the success of Wish You Were Here, which the two companies ever formed a relationship that the relationship was more subtle than a 50/50 agreement, but essentially was an equal partnership, and the two companies would hold proportionate equity in all three pictures worldwide and the first wave of pictures was a production called Patty, as well as For Queen and Country and The Wolves of Willoughby Chase, a co-production between the Czech and the U.S., and Atlantic would handle worldwide rights for the former, and had North American rights to the latter two, and foreign sales would be handled by Zenith's Sales Company.

In January 1989, Atlantic made a new deal with Kartes Video Communications for home video rights to the movies previously covered in the Paramount deal. The library was bought by Island Pictures, which took over soliciting the films to home video. Island themselves suffered financial losses soon after, defaulting to Crédit Lyonnais, and both the Atlantic and Island libraries were absorbed into the bank's large "Epic" catalogue of films inherited from studios that had borrowed and defaulted to the financial institution. PolyGram Filmed Entertainment purchased the large catalogue from Crédit Lyonnais in 1997; a year later, when PolyGram themselves were acquired by Universal Studios, Universal sold PolyGram's pre-1996 library to Metro-Goldwyn-Mayer in October 1998.

For a number of years, Paramount Pictures had television and video distribution rights to Atlantic's library, some from their previous deal with the company, and others inherited when Viacom, who had purchased television rights to many earlier Atlantic releases, merged with Paramount. MGM via PolyGram Filmed Entertainment now distributes most of the library as a result of purchasing the pre-1996 portion of PolyGram's library.

Filmography 
Some of the company's most notable films include:

 The Murri Affair (1974)
 He Is My Brother (1975)
 Caddie (1976)
 In Search of Bigfoot (1976)
 Max Havelaar (1976)
 Something to Hide (1976)
 Bonjour Amour (1977)
 The Day the Music Died (1977)
 Madame Rosa (1977)
 Lady on the Bus (1978)
 Boarding School (1978)
 The Getting of Wisdom (1978)
 The Hound of the Baskervilles (1978)
 The Irishman (1978)
 The Odd Job (1978)
 Once in Paris... (1978)
 Bahia (1979)
 Boardwalk (1979)
 Womanlight (1979)
 The Attic (1980)
 Below the Belt (1980)
 I Sent a Letter to My Love (1980)
 Rude Boy (1980)
 Eu Te Amo (1981)
 Montenegro (1981)
 Peter-No-Tail (1981)
 Aphrodite (1982)
 Breach of Contract (1982)
 By Design (1982)
 The Loveless (1982)
 Norman Loves Rose (1982)
 Smash Palace (1982)
 Waltz Across Texas (1982)
 Valley Girl (1983)
 The Smurfs and the Magic Flute (1983)
 Kamla (1984)
 Talk to Me (1984)
 Alphabet City (1984)
 Vamping (1984)
 1984 (1984)
 City Limits (1984)
 Night of the Comet (1984)
 Roadhouse 66 (1985)
 He-Man and She-Ra: The Secret of the Sword (1985)
 Here Come the Littles (1985)
 Starchaser: The Legend of Orin (1985)
 Teen Wolf (1985)
 Water (1985, produced by Handmade Films)
 Echo Park (1986)
 Extremities (1986)
 The Fringe Dwellers (1986)
 The Men's Club (1986)
 Modern Girls (1986)
 Nomads (1986)
 Nutcracker: The Motion Picture (1986)
 Stephen King's World of Horror (1986) (TV)
 Stoogemania (1986)

 Clubhouse Pictures 
The company also had a division called "Clubhouse Pictures" to release family films; theaters screening these titles participated in the "Clubhouse Family Network". Films and television series released under this label include:

 The Adventures of Mark Twain (March 1, 1985)
 Hey There, It's Yogi Bear! (January 17, 1986) (reissue of the 1964 film)
 Heathcliff: The Movie (January 17, 1986)
 The Adventures of the American Rabbit (February 14, 1986)
 Peter-No-Tail in Americat (February 19, 1986)
 GoBots: Battle of the Rock Lords (March 21, 1986)
 Teen Wolf'' (September 13, 1986 – November 7, 1987) (later produced by Atlantic/Kushner-Locke)

Notes

References 

 
Film distributors of the United States
Defunct mass media companies of the United States
Entertainment companies established in 1974
Entertainment companies disestablished in 1989
1974 establishments in Alaska
American companies established in 1974
American companies disestablished in 1989